Prosper Mendy (born 7 June 1996) is a footballer who plays as a left back for  Kazakh club Kaisar. Born in France, he plays for the Guinea-Bissau national team.

Career
Mendy is a youth product of UF Clichy-sous-Bois, FC Montfermeil, and Francs Borains. Mendy started his professional career with CD Badajoz in Spain. In 2019, he signed for Strømsgodset Toppfotball in the Norwegian Eliteserien, where he has made fourteen appearances and scored one goal.

On 25 December 2021, Mendy agreed to join Virton in Belgium.

On 12 June 2022 he signed a contract with the Bulgarian First League team Spartak Varna for 3 years.

International career
On 14 September 2022 Mendy  received his first call-up for Guinea-Bissau.

Personal life
Born in France, Mendy is of Senegalese and Bissau-Guinean descent.

References

1996 births
Living people
Footballers from Paris
Bissau-Guinean footballers
Guinea-Bissau international footballers
French footballers
Bissau-Guinean people of Senegalese descent
French sportspeople of Senegalese descent
Association football fullbacks
Strømsgodset Toppfotball players
CD Badajoz players
R.E. Virton players
PFC Spartak Varna players
Segunda División B players
Eliteserien players
Challenger Pro League players
Bissau-Guinean expatriate footballers
French expatriate footballers
Expatriate footballers in Spain
French expatriate sportspeople in Spain
Expatriate footballers in Norway
French expatriate sportspeople in Norway
Expatriate footballers in Belgium
French expatriate sportspeople in Belgium
Francs Borains players